Shamu  (unknown – August 16, 1971) was a captive orca that appeared in shows at SeaWorld San Diego in the mid/late 1960s. She was the fourth orca ever captured, and the second female. She was caught in October 1965 and died in August 1971, after about six years of captivity. After her death, the name Shamu continued to be used in SeaWorld "Shamu" shows for different orcas in different SeaWorld parks.

Early life
Shamu was the first known intentional live capture of a healthy orca as the three previous captures (Wanda, Moby Doll and Namu) had been more opportunistic. The very young, 14-foot (4.25m), 2000 lb (900 kg) Southern resident orca was captured by Ted Griffin off Penn Cove, Puget Sound, Washington in October 1965 to be a companion for the male orca Namu at Griffin's Seattle public aquarium. Her name means ‘Friend of Namu’ (alternatively 'She-Namu'). Shamu was sold to SeaWorld in San Diego in December 1965.

Captivity
Shamu was retired from performing after an incident on April 19, 1971, in which she bit the legs and hips of Annette Eckis, a SeaWorld employee who was told to ride her as part of a filmed publicity event, and refused to release the woman until other workers came to the rescue and pried the whale's jaws apart with a pole. The employee had been asked to ride Shamu while wearing a bikini, and had not known that the orca had previously attacked people who wore ordinary bathing suits and was only conditioned to perform with trainers wearing wetsuits. Shamu had also been showing signs of erratic behavior and of being upset just before the incident.

Shamu died about four months later, on August 16, 1971.

See also
 List of individual cetaceans

References

External links
"Era of the Orca Cowboys" article by Daniel Francis and Gil Hewlett in The Tyee webzine, May 16, 2008

Individual orcas
1971 animal deaths
SeaWorld San Diego
Southern resident orcas